Feldolling is a village in the municipality Feldkirchen-Westerham in the district of Rosenheim, in Bavaria, Germany. It is 22 km west of Rosenheim and about 45 km south of Munich.

Rosenheim (district)